Blue skin may refer to:

Argyria, a condition caused by the ingestion of elemental silver, silver dust or silver compounds
Methemoglobinemia, the presence of excessive levels of methemoglobin in the blood
Cyanosis, a change of skin color due to decreased amounts of oxygenated hemoglobin
Blue baby syndrome, cyanosis in babies
Purpura, hemorrhagic lesions caused by bleeding underneath the skin
Bruise
Petechia

See also
Blueskin (disambiguation)
Blue people (disambiguation)